Oleksandr Oleksandrovych Skipalskyi (born March 12, 1945) is a Ukrainian military officer and spy. For over 20 years he worked as a Soviet border guard and military counterintelligence.

Skipalskyi was born on March 12, 1945, in a village of Vyzhhiv (today in Liuboml Raion). Born in the Western Ukraine, he was growing up in Yenakieve (Eastern Ukraine) where he finished a high school and vocational college.

In 1968 Skipalskyi graduated the Moscow Border Guard military college, after which he served for the border guard troops in Ukraine. In 1975 Skipalskyi graduated the KGB Higher School and served as a counterintelligence agent in the Russian Far East (Siberia and Kuril islands).

In 1987 Skipalskyi returned to Ukraine where he served in special divisions of KGB. In October 1990 Skipalskyi was excluded out of the Communist Party of the Soviet Union. In 1990-92 he worked for the agricultural bank "Ukraine".

In 1992-97 Skipalskyi was the head of Chief Directorate of Intelligence of the Ministry of Defence of Ukraine where along with Mykola Kuzmin, he organized practically a completely new intelligence agency on an empty spot. During that time Skipalskyi also was elected the People's Deputy of Ukraine.

In 1997-2004 Skipalskyi worked as a deputy chairman of the Security Service of Ukraine, a deputy minister of Emergencies, an adviser to the minister of Justice. In 2004 he headed the security service of presidential candidate Viktor Yushchenko.

In 2006-07 Skipalskyi was a chief of the regional office of Security Service of Ukraine in Donetsk Oblast.

External links
 Profile at the Verkhovna Rada website.
 Profile at the Official Ukraine Today portal.
 Interview with Skipalskyi at the Oral history of Ukraine
 Interview with Skipaslkyi on the poisoning of Yushchenko and the experience of working in Donetsk Oblast

1945 births
Living people
People from Volyn Oblast
FSB Academy alumni
Ukrainian military personnel
Ukrainian spies
People of the Chief Directorate of Intelligence (Ukraine)
Lieutenant generals of Ukraine
KGB officers
Communist Party of the Soviet Union members
Party of Democratic Revival of Ukraine politicians
Second convocation members of the Verkhovna Rada
Recipients of the Honorary Diploma of the Cabinet of Ministers of Ukraine